The  is one of nine active divisions of the Japan Ground Self-Defense Force. The division is subordinated to the Central Army and is headquartered in Itami, Hyōgo. Its responsibility is the defense of the Hyōgo, Kyōto, Nara, Ōsaka, Shiga and Wakayama  prefectures.

The division was raised on 18 January 1962.

Organization 

 3rd Division, in Itami
 3rd Division HQ, in Itami
 7th Infantry Regiment, in Fukuchiyama, with 1x headquarters, 5x infantry, and 1x 120mm mortar company
 36th Infantry Regiment, in Itami, with 1x headquarters, 5x infantry, and 1x 120mm mortar company
 37th Infantry Regiment, in Izumi, with 1x headquarters, 5x infantry, and 1x 120mm mortar company
 3rd Tank Battalion, in Takashima, with 2x Type 74 tank company
 3rd Artillery Battalion, in Himeji, with 4x batteries of FH-70 towed howitzers
 3rd Anti-Aircraft Artillery Battalion, in Himeji, with Type 81 and Type 93 Surface-to-air missile systems
 3rd Engineer Battalion (Combat), in Uji
 3rd Signal Battalion, in Itami
 3rd Aviation Squadron, in Yao, flying UH-1J and OH-6D helicopters
 3rd NBC Protection Company, in Itami
 3rd Logistic Support Regiment, in Itami
 1st Maintenance Battalion
 2nd Maintenance Battalion
 Supply Company
 Medical Company
 Transport Company

External links 
 Homepage 3rd Division (Japanese)

Japan Ground Self-Defense Force Division
Military units and formations established in 1962